Death and funeral of Queen Elizabeth may refer to:

 Death and state funeral of Elizabeth II (1926–2022), Queen of the United Kingdom from 1952 to 2022
 Death and funeral of Queen Elizabeth The Queen Mother (1900–2002), Queen of the United Kingdom from 1936 to 1952